Joseph Tardif (17 May 1860 – 14 June 1920) was an Australian cricketer. He played in four first-class matches for South Australia from 1889 to 1893.

See also
 List of South Australian representative cricketers

References

External links
 

1860 births
1920 deaths
Australian cricketers
South Australia cricketers
Cricketers from Adelaide